Calochortus dunnii is a rare species of flowering plant in the lily family known by the common name Dunn's mariposa lily.

Distribution
The plant is endemic to the Peninsular Ranges, native to southern San Diego County, California; and northern Baja California state, Mexico.

Description
Calochortus dunnii is a perennial herb growing a slender, branching stem up to 60 centimeters tall. The waxy, channeled basal leaf is 10 to 20 centimeters long and withers at flowering.

The inflorescence bears 2 to 6 erect bell-shaped flowers. Each flower has three sepals and three white or pinkish petals. The petals are up to 3 centimeters long and spotted with red and yellow near the bases, where there are patches of yellow hairs.

The fruit is a narrow, angled capsule 2 to 3 centimeters long.

Conservation
Although the plant isn't seriously impacted by any one major problem, the main threat to the existence of this rare species is collecting by admirers of the attractive flowers.

References

External links 
 
 
 Calflora Database: Calochortus dunnii (Dunn's mariposa lily)
 Jepson Manual Treatment of Calochortus dunnii
 USDA Plants Profile for Calochortus dunnii (Dunn's mariposa lily)
 Flora of North America
 UC Photos gallery — Calochortus dunnii

dunnii
Flora of Baja California
Flora of California
Natural history of the California chaparral and woodlands
Natural history of the Peninsular Ranges
Cuyamaca Mountains
~
Plants described in 1901